Aline dos Santos (born 5 May 1985 in Rio de Janeiro) is a Brazilian sprinter. She competed in the 4 × 400 m relay event at the 2012 Summer Olympics.

References

Athletes from Rio de Janeiro (city)
Brazilian female sprinters
1985 births
Living people
Olympic athletes of Brazil
Athletes (track and field) at the 2012 Summer Olympics
Olympic female sprinters